Thanatos is the Ancient Greek personification of death.

Thanatos may also refer to:

Arts and entertainment

Music
 Thanatos (band), a Dutch extreme metal band
 Thanatos (album), by Relatives Menschsein, 2002
 "Thanatos", a song by The Skids from the 1979 album Days in Europa
 "Thanatos", a character and track on the 2008 Sound Horizon album Moira
 "Thanatos", a song by Soap&Skin from the 2009 album Lovetune for Vacuum
 "Thanatos -If I Can't Be Yours-", a song in the Neon Genesis Evangelion franchise

Fictional characters 
 Thanatos (comics), from Marvel Comics
 Thanatos (Saint Seiya), a manga character
 Thanatos, from the fantasy book Incarnations of Immortality
 Thanatos, from TV cartoon series Chris Colorado
 Thanatos, from video game Secret of Mana
 Thanatos, from video game Chaos Legion
 Thanatos, from video game Hades (video game)
 Thanatos, from video game Persona 3

Other uses in arts and entertainment
 Thanatos (video game), 1986

Other uses 
 Thanatos (psychoanalysis), or death drive, in classical Freudian psychoanalytic theory
 Thanatos, a synonym for Bothriechis venomous pit vipers

See also

Xanatos (disambiguation)
 Thanatus, a genus of false crab spiders
 Thanatomorphose, a 2012 horror film